Phorinae is a subfamily of flies in the family Phoridae. There are at least 90 described species in Phorinae.

Genera
Abaristophora Schmitz, 1927
Anevrina Lioy, 1864
Borophaga Enderlein, 1924
Chaetopleurophora Schmitz, 1922
Conicera Meigen, 1830
Coniceromyia Borgmeier, 1923
Diplonevra Lioy, 1864
Dohrniphora Dahl, 1898
Hypocera Lioy, 1864
Hypocerides Schmitz, 1915
Phora Latreille, 1796
Spiniphora Malloch, 1909
Stichillus Enderlein, 1924
Triphleba Rondani, 1856

References

Further reading

 Diptera.info
 NCBI Taxonomy Browser, Phorinae
 

Phoridae
Brachycera subfamilies